In architecture, a hongsalmun is a gate for entering a sacred place in Korea. Hongsalmun, also called hongjeonmun or hongmun, are usually erected to indicate Korean Confucian sites, such as shrines, tombs, and academies such as hyanggyo and seowon. The gate indicates entry to a sacred realm.

Features 
Hongsalmun literally means ‘gate with red arrows’, referring to the set of pointed spikes on its top. In the past, spikes in between columns did not exist. The color is said to be red because of the belief that the color repels ghosts. The gate is composed of two round poles set vertically and two transverse bars. These pillars are usually over nine meters in height. There is no roof and no door-gate. In the middle top gate the symbol of the trisula and the taegeuk image are placed.

The hongsalmun gate opens to a path that leads toward the front of hyanggyo and the hamabi or the "memorial dismount stone". The gate can also be found inside a seowon, a privately owned complex that served as a Confucian shrine and preparatory school.

Gallery

See also
 Iljumun, religious portal
 Torana, a type of Hindu-Buddhist gate
 Torii, in Japanese temple architecture
 Paifang, in Chinese temple architecture
 Tam quan, in Vietnamese temple and pagoda architecture

References

Architecture in Korea